Bardo is a locality in Alberta, Canada.

The community was named after Bardo, in Norway, the native land of a large share of the first settlers.

References 

Localities in Beaver County, Alberta